The A.G. Huntsman Award for Excellence in the Marine Sciences was established in 1980 by the Canadian marine science community to recognize excellence of research and outstanding contributions to marine sciences. It is presented by the Royal Society of Canada. The award honours marine scientists of any nationality who have had and continue to have a significant influence on the course of marine scientific thought.  It is named in honour of Archibald Gowanlock Huntsman (1883–1973), a pioneer Canadian oceanographer and fishery biologist.

A.G. Huntsman Medal
The award consists of a specially designed fine silver medal showing the CSS Hudson.

A.G. Huntsman Foundation
The A.G. Huntsman Award is administered by the A.G. Huntsman Foundation,   based at the Bedford Institute of Oceanography, Nova Scotia.  The Foundation is organized as an independent, charitable, tax free foundation. Business of the Foundation is conducted by a Board of Directors and Executive Officers. The Lieutenant Governor of Nova Scotia serves as Honorary Patron of the Huntsman Foundation.
The  Award is presented annually by the Royal Society of Canada. The annual process of selection is conducted by a separate Selection Committee of Canadian marine scientists. The  award ceremony takes place in the late fall at the Bedford Institute of Oceanography.

The Award was created in 1980 under the leadership of scientists at the Bedford Institute of Oceanography.  The award is now recognized as a major international prize. It is   funded principally by interest earned on financial contributions originally received from   Fisheries and Oceans Canada,   Natural Resources Canada, the   Province of Nova Scotia, and the   Canadian Association of Petroleum Producers. Additional endowment was later granted from the LiFT Family Fund through Gift Funds Canada.

Nominations
The A.G. Huntsman Medal is awarded to those men and women, of any nationality, who have had and still have a significant influence on the course of marine scientific thought; for unequalled excellence in their respective fields; for the influence of their work on the course of scientific thought in their respective fields; and for their continuing and current activities at the forefront of their respective fields.

The A.G. Huntsman Award reflects the multi-faceted nature of research in the world's oceans. From 1980 to 2013, the Award was presented annually in one of three categories – Marine Geoscience, Physical/Chemical Oceanography, and Biological Oceanography and Fisheries Science – except in its inaugural year when recipients were honoured in all three. To mark its 25th Anniversary in 2005, the Award was again presented in all three of the above categories, as well as in the category of Interdisciplinary Marine Science. Since 2014, the category distinctions have been dropped in recognition that many facets of marine science are multi-disciplinary or interdisciplinary in character.

Awardees
Source: A.G.Huntsman Award

See also

 List of oceanography awards

References

External links
 Official website
Oceanography awards
Science and technology awards